A constitutional referendum was held in the Helvetic Republic over several months in 1798. Modelled after the French Constitution of the Year III of 1795, the new constitution was approved by voters. In some places voting took places in public assemblies, whilst in others the local councils took the decision.

Results

References

1798 referendums
Referendums in Switzerland
Constitutional referendums
1798 in Europe
Helvetic Republic